Region I (Spanish: Región 1. Amecameca) is an intrastate region within the State of Mexico, one of 16.  It borders the states of Puebla and Morelos in the southeast corner of the state.  The region comprises thirteen municipalities: Amecameca, Ayapango, Ecatzingo, Juchitepec, Tepetlixpa, Tlalmanalco.  It is largely rural.

Municipalities 
Amecameca
Atlautla
Ayapango
Chalco
Ecatzingo
Juchitepec
Temamatla
Tenango del Aire
Tepetlixpa
Tlalmanalco

References

Regions of the State of Mexico